The women's baseball tournament at the 2015 Pan American Games in Toronto, Canada, was held at the President's Choice Ajax Pan Am Ballpark in Ajax, from July 20 to 26. Women's baseball was making its Pan American Games debut, after being added to the program at the 2013 Pan American Sports Organization's general assembly. All women's matches happened on the main field.

For these Games, the women competed in a 5-team tournament. The teams were grouped into one single pool and all teams played each other in a round-robin preliminary round. The top two teams after the round robin played for gold, and teams ranked third and fourth contested the bronze-medal match.

Qualification
A total of five women's team qualified to compete at the games. Canada as host nation qualified automatically, along with the top four nations at the qualification event held in March 2015. Women's rosters can have a maximum of 18 athletes.

Summary

Medalists

Rosters

At the start of tournament, all five participating countries had up to 18 players on their rosters.

Results
The official detailed schedule was revealed on April 20, 2015.

All times are Eastern Daylight Time (UTC−4)

Preliminary round

Medal round

Bronze medal match

Gold medal match

Final standings

References

Women
Baseball at the 2015 Pan American Games
Women's baseball competitions
2010s in women's baseball
2015 in baseball